Prince Vasily Mikhailovich Dolgorukov-Krymsky (Russian: Князь Васи́лий Миха́йлович Долгору́ков-Кры́мский; 1 July 1722 – 30 January 1782) was a general of the Russian Empire and Governor-General of Moscow from 1780 to 1782. Already a seasoned veteran of several wars, he was a senior military commander of the Russo-Turkish War of 1768–1774, where his forces occupied the Crimean Khanate, from which he derived his honorary title of "Krymsky".

He was the original builder and owner of the House of the Unions and numerous other historic mansions that dot the city of Moscow.

Biography
Vasily Mikhailovich was the son of senator and governor of Siberia Prince Mikhail Vladimirovich Dolgorukov from his marriage to Princess Yevdokiya Yurievna Odoyevskaya. His childhood was marked by the disgrace and imprisonment of his uncle Vasily Vladimirovich Dolgorukov under the reign of Empress Anna Ioannovna, which affected the entire family. Vasily Mikhailovich was inducted into the military as a private in 1735 at the age of 13, where he gained his first combat experience fighting under Field Marshal Burkhard Christoph von Münnich in the Crimea. He would distinguish himself at the Siege of Perekop. Before the storming of the fortress, Münnich promised that the first soldier to ascend the fortifications alive would be promoted to officer. Young Dolgorukov would prove to be that soldier, and was given the rank of poruchik.
 
When Anna had ascended the throne, she had ordered that no one from the Dolgorukov family be granted officer rank in the military, that they could only be allowed in the enlisted ranks. According to research by Valentin Pikul, Münnich reported the events of the siege to the Empress in person, including his act of promoting Vasily. Anna simply replied to her general, "Do not take away my sword from this suckling", and so Vasily Mikhailovich became the only member of his entire noble clan to be exempted from the ban during her ten-year reign.

Under the rule of Elizabeth Petrovna, Dolgorukov would find himself promoted rapidly through the ranks. In 1741 he would be made a captain, and by 1745 would be a lieutenant-colonel and adjutant to his now rehabilitated uncle Vasily Vladamirovich, who had been appointed president of the Collegium of War, the body that oversaw the entire Imperial Army. In 1747 he was made a full colonel and given command over his own regiment, the Tobolsk Infantry. According to the recollections of Prince Yakov Shakhovskoy, which he cited from his personal notes, Dolgorukov conspicuously studied from his fellow commanders to improve his knowledge of military affairs.

Seven Years' War

Dolgorukov, now a major-general, served in the Seven Years' War, distinguishing himself at both the Siege of Küstrin and the subsequent Battle of Zorndorf in August 1758. For the valor he demonstrated at Küstrin, he would later be promoted to lieutenant-general and awarded the Order of Alexander Nevsky. Towards the end of this campaign Dolgorukov was wounded in the leg by canister shot, and had to seek treatment for his injury, but the General recovered in time to lead an infantry brigade at the Kunersdorf. He was also present at the Third Siege of Kolberg as one of Rumyanstev's subordinates. When Catherine the Great took power towards the end of the war, she made a point of favoring Dolgorukov for his service, having him promoted to general-in-chief on the day of her formal coronation. In 1767 she would award him the Order of St. Andrew, the highest order of knighthood in the Russian Empire.

Russo-Turkish War of 1768–1774

In 1769 Prince Dolgorukov was assigned the mission to cordon off the border between the Russia and the Crimean Khanate with his detachment of troops. The next year he succeeded Petr Ivanovich Panin as commander of the 2nd Field Army.

References

1722 births
1782 deaths
Vasily Mikhailovich
Recipients of the Order of St. George of the First Degree
Russian military personnel of the Seven Years' War
Governors-General of Moscow